The 2010–11 Vermont Catamounts season was their sixth in Hockey East. Led by head coach Tim Bothwell, the Catamounts were unable to qualify for the NCAA hockey tournament. Of note, Roxanne Douville, who was a projected to be a top 10 CWHL draft pick, became only the second Vermont player to be named to the Hockey East All-Rookie Team.

Exhibition

Regular season
Saturday October 16 marked seniors Peggy Wakeham and Jul Sifers 100th career game at Vermont
October 22: Vermont defeated Yale for the first time as a Division I program.
Roxanne Douville stopped 43 saves on Friday earning her a 1–1 tie at Northeastern. She recorded 18 stops in the opening frame vs. the Huskies and tallied 15 saves in the third period to help the Catamounts earn a point in the WHEA standings.
Through October 31, Peggy Wakeham extended her goal scoring streak to four games.
November 7–8: Roxanne Douville stopped 59 of  63 shots for a .937 save percentage in road games versus New Hampshire and No. 6 Boston College. She recorded 35 saves on Sunday vs. the Eagles at Conte Forum, including six in the extra frame.
November 12–13: Roxanne Douville stopped 63 of the 66 shots (.955 save%) she faced this weekend on the road earning consecutive ties against fifth ranked Boston University at Walter Brown Arena. She notched 33 stops on Friday and totaled 30 saves on Saturday.
Roxanne Douville led the Catamounts to a 0–3–4 record in the month of November. She registered a 1.64 GAA and .943 save percentage. During the month, she had 200 saves and recorded 30+ saves four times in the month. On November 27, Douville had a 42-save effort. For her efforts, she was the ECAC Pro Ambitions Rookie of the Week three times in the month.
Heading into the Holiday Break, Vermont is 2-0-7 when scoring the first goal this season. In the first half of the season, the Catamounts have gone to overtime nine times in 18 games
February 11: Juli Sifers (2 goals, 1 assist) and Erin Wente (1 goal, 2 assists) led the Catamounts with three points each, while goaltender Roxanne Douville made 26 saves in a 4–2 victory over New Hampshire.
March 2: Roxanne Douville was named to the Hockey East All-Rookie Team. She became only the second Vermont player to be named to the Hockey East All-Rookie Team.

Standings

Schedule

Conference record

Awards and honors
Roxanne Douville, Hockey East Pro Ambitions Rookie of the Week (Week of November 1)
Roxanne Douville, Hockey East Pro Ambitions Rookie of the Week (Week of November 8)
Roxanne Douville, Hockey East Pro Ambitions Rookie of the Week, (Week of November 15) 
Roxanne Douville, Hockey East Co-Rookie of the Month, November 2010
Erin Wente, Hockey East Pure Hockey Player of the Week (Week of December 4)

Postseason
Roxanne Douville, 2010-11 Hockey East All-Rookie team

References

V
V
Vermont Catamounts women's ice hockey seasons
Cata
Cata